A leap year is a year with an extra day (February 29). Leap year of leap years may also refer to:

Films

 Leap Year (1924 film) – American film
 Leap Year (1932 film) – British film
 Leap Year (2010 film) – American film
 Leap Year, an Australian short film by Aaron Wilson (director)
 The Leap Years,  2008 Singaporean film, a.k.a. Leap of Love 
 Año bisiesto (Leap Year), 2010 Mexican film directed by Michael Rowe

Television

 Leap Years – a 2001 drama television series

See also
 Leap second
 February 29 (film) – 2006 South Korean film